Luca Belingheri (born 6 April 1983) is an Italian retired footballer who played as a midfielder. He is currently the assistant coach of Cremonese's U19s.

Club career
Belingheri started at Alzano in Serie C1 in the 2001–02 season where he made 26 appearances and scored 1 goal. He then moved to Siena of Serie B but he moved again in January 2003 to Como Calcio of Serie A after making just 3 appearances. He made his Serie A debut on  3 May 2003, against A.C. Milan.
He stayed at Como Calcio for a year and made 18 scoring a single goal. In 2004, he started his first spell at Ascoli and made 20 appearances. In summer 2005, Ascoli bought him outright from Genoa but sent him to AlbinoLeffe in joint-ownership bid. With AlbinoLeffe Belingheri played 25 games in 2006–07 Serie B. In June 2007 Belingheri returned to Ascoli but again only made 15 starts in 2009–10 Serie B.

He joined Torino in July 2009, as part of the deal, Marco Moro moved to Ascoli. He then moved to Livorno in January 2011. On 24 January 2014, he was loaned to Cesena and scored a goal in his debut match against Varese. In the summer of 2015 is consistent with the Modena; the following year passes to Cremonese.

On 30 August 2019, he signed with Pergolettese. He left the club on 31 January 2020.

Later career
After leaving Pergolettese in January 2020, Belingheri remained without club until the summer 2020, where he was hired as assistant coach of Cremonese's U19 team under head coach Elia Pavesi.

References

External links

Profile at Torino 

1983 births
Sportspeople from the Province of Bergamo
Living people
Italian footballers
Association football midfielders
Virtus Bergamo Alzano Seriate 1909 players
Como 1907 players
A.C.N. Siena 1904 players
Ascoli Calcio 1898 F.C. players
U.C. AlbinoLeffe players
Torino F.C. players
U.S. Livorno 1915 players
A.C. Cesena players
Modena F.C. players
U.S. Cremonese players
Calcio Padova players
U.S. Pergolettese 1932 players
Serie A players
Serie B players
Serie C players
Footballers from Lombardy